For Every Punk Bitch and Arse Hole by Hang on the Box was released on 6 October 2003 licensed by Sister Benten Online on the labels Arrivederci Baby! and Cherry Red. It was the band's European debut, made up of some of the best material from their previous albums, Yellow Banana and Di Di Di, complemented by the addition of an unreleased live recording.

Track listing
 No Sexy
 Kill Your Belly
 Bitch
 Heroin and Cocaine
 oooo
 Ass Hole, I'm Not Your Baby
 Motorcycle Boy
 What is Now?
 Now I Wanna Say My Apology
 I Am Mine
 Leave Me
 You Lost Everything But It's Not My Fault (Recorded live at Shinjuku Loft 18 April 2003)

References
Extracts on MySpace.com
Sister Benten Records Online

Hang on the Box albums
2003 compilation albums